Hot R&B/Hip-Hop Songs is a chart published by Billboard that ranks the top-performing songs in the United States in African-American-oriented musical genres; the chart has undergone various name changes since its launch in 1942 to reflect the evolution of such genres.  In 1977, it was published under the title Hot Soul Singles.  During that year, 21 different singles topped the chart, based on playlists submitted by radio stations and surveys of retail sales outlets.

In the issue of Billboard dated January 1, the group Rose Royce was at number one with "Car Wash", the song's second week in the top spot.  It was displaced the following week by "Darlin' Darlin' Baby (Sweet, Tender, Love)" by the O'Jays.  The year's longest-running number one was "Serpentine Fire" by Earth, Wind & Fire, which reached the peak position in the issue of Billboard dated November 19 and stayed there for the remainder of the year, a total of seven consecutive weeks in the top spot.  This also meant that the band had the highest total number of weeks at number one during the year, just ahead of two acts with six weeks in the top spot.  The only act to achieve more than one number one during 1977 was Stevie Wonder, who spent five weeks in the top spot with "I Wish" and one with "Sir Duke".

The Floaters, whose single "Float On" was recognized by Billboard as the year's top soul single, were among a number of acts that topped the soul singles chart in 1977 for the first time in their respective careers.  Thelma Houston, the Emotions and Slave also reached the top spot for the first time during the year as did William Bell, who had recorded his debut single in 1961 and first appeared on the chart in 1966 but taken more than a decade to gain his first number one.  None of the five acts who topped the chart for the first time during 1977 would go on to achieve any further chart-toppers and the Floaters would not chart at all after 1978, despite both "Float On" and the album from which it was taken being million-sellers.  Six of the year's soul number ones also topped the all-genre Hot 100 chart: both of Stevie Wonder's chart-toppers along with "Car Wash" by Rose Royce, Thelma Houston's "Don't Leave Me This Way", "Got to Give It Up (Part 1)" by Marvin Gaye and "Best of My Love" by the Emotions.  Other songs, however, did not achieve significant crossover success: "The Pride (Part 1)" by the Isley Brothers could only climb as high as number 63 on the Hot 100.

Chart history

See also
 List of Billboard Hot 100 number-one singles of 1977

References

1977 record charts
1977
1977 in American music